The Baladiyah (singular), or baladiyat (plural),  is the current second-level administration subdivision of Libya being reintroduced in 2012 by the General National Congress with Law 59 on the system of local administration, dividing the country into governorates (muhafazat) and districts (baladiyat), with baladiyah having local councils.

Baladiyah is an Arabic word used in many Arab countries to denote administrative divisions of a country.

History
Baladiyat were first introduced in Libya in 1983 to replace the governorate system.  The ten existing governorates were replaced with forty-six baladiyat, but in 1988 that number was reduced to twenty-five baladiyat. In 1995 they were replaced by shabiyat. For Libya, the baladiyat are usually known in English as "districts" and sometimes as "municipalities", but the municipal level under the baladiyat and subsequent shabiyat systems was the Basic People's Congress. After the fall of Gaddafi and the transfer of government from the interim National Transitional Council to the elected General National Congress, the previous shabiyat and Basic People's Congress system was deemed inappropriate, and a revised system  was authorized with governorates (muhafazat) as the primary division and districts (baladiyat) as their subdivision, with baladiyat having local councils. This was implemented in part by the Council of Ministers with resolution No. 180 in July 2013, creating the baladiyah. There were originally ninety-nine baladiyat listed for Libya, but by March 2015 that number had grown to 108. The first-level administration subdivisions, the governorates (muhafazat), have yet to be created due to a vested interest in maintaining decentralized governance, and the continuing civil war.

1988
 
The table hereunder lists the old twenty-five baladiyat in alphabetical order with a link to each one and numbered to be located on the map. Note that each district linked may be both a baladiyah and a shabiyah. The many changes may not always be reflected in the linked article.

2013
Below is a list of the 99 baladiyat in Libya as created July 2013.

See also
 Provinces of Libya
 Governorates of Libya

References

 
Municipalities of Libya (1983–1995)
Subdivisions of Libya